Oosomini is a tribe of weevils in the subfamily Entiminae.

Genera 
 
 Barianus 
 Basothorhynchus 
 Brachycyclus
 Bryochaeta 
 Catalalus 
 Chalepoderus 
 Cladeyterus 
 Cosmorhinus
 Cycliscus 
 Ellimenistes 
 Ellimorrhinus 
 Eurhynchomys 
 Glyptosomus 
 Holcolaccus 
 Neobrachyocyrtus 
 Neobryocheta 
 Oosomus
 Periderces 
 Phlyctinus 
 Piezoderes 
 Porpacus 
 Pyctoderes 
 Rhysoderes 
 Syntaptocerus

References 

 Lacordaire, T. 1863: Histoire Naturelle des Insectes. Genera des Coléoptères ou exposé méthodique et critique de tous les genres proposés jusqu'ici dans cet ordre d'insectes. Vol.: 6. Roret. Paris: 637 pp.
 Alonso-Zarazaga, M.A.; Lyal, C.H.C. 1999: A world catalogue of families and genera of Curculionoidea (Insecta: Coleoptera) (excepting Scolytidae and Platypodidae). Entomopraxis, Barcelona.

External links 

Basothorhynchus endroedyi • A New Oosomini Genus (Coleoptera: Curculionidae: Entiminae) from the Highland Plateau of Lesotho

Entiminae